Guty Cárdenas (1905–1932; full name Augusto Alejandro Cárdenas Pinelo) was a Mexican composer, singer and guitarist, noted as a representative of the cancion yucateca style of music. His well-known works include "Nunca", with lyrics by Ricardo López Méndez.  He spent several years in the US, recording with Columbia Records.

He was killed, at the age of 27, by a stray bullet during a gunfight in a Mexico City bar.

The 1989 Aki Kaurismäki film Leningrad Cowboys Go America is dedicated to his memory.

References

Mexican male singer-songwriters
Mexican composers
Mexican male composers
Mexican male guitarists
1905 births
1932 deaths
People from Mérida, Yucatán
Musicians from Yucatán (state)
Singers from Yucatán (state)
Writers from Yucatán (state)
20th-century composers
20th-century guitarists
20th-century Mexican male singers